Shihabuddin Bayazid Shah was a Sultan of Bengal for a brief period between 1413 and 1414 CE. He succeeded his father Saifuddin Hamza Shah.

Shihab ad-Din Bayazid Shah continued the friendly relation with China like his predecessors and once sent a giraffe to the Chinese emperor with a letter written on a golden leaf. He issued coins from AH 814 to AH 817. The numismatic evidence shows that he was succeeded by his son Ala ad-Din Firuz Shah, who issued coins in AH 817. According to Firishta, Raja Ganesha usurped the throne after the death of Shihab-ud-Din Bayazid Shah, while according to the Riaz-us-Salatin, a late chronicle written in 1788, Raja Ganesha killed Shihabuddin Bayazid Shah and usurped the throne.

See also
Ilyas Shahi dynasty
List of rulers of Bengal
History of Bengal
History of Bangladesh
History of India

References

1414 deaths
Year of birth unknown
15th-century Indian monarchs
Ilyas Shahi dynasty